Ben Farthing Farm is a historic farm and national historic district located near Sugar Grove, Watauga County, North Carolina.  The complex includes a modest 1 1/2-story frame bungalow (1923), a large frame bank barn of traditional gambrel-roof form (1935), a root cellar built into a mountainside (1938), a frame outhouse (1938), and a frame scale house (1941).  The buildings are set in a vernacular landscaping of native rock (1939).

It was listed on the National Register of Historic Places in 1993.

References

Farms on the National Register of Historic Places in North Carolina
Historic districts on the National Register of Historic Places in North Carolina
Buildings and structures in Watauga County, North Carolina
National Register of Historic Places in Watauga County, North Carolina